Pinelands railway station is a Metrorail station situated on the western edge of Pinelands, a suburb of Cape Town, South Africa. It is served by trains on the Cape Flats Line and the Central Line. Cape Flats Line trains travel from Cape Town through Pinelands and Athlone to Retreat. Central Line trains travel from Cape Town through Pinelands and Langa to Mitchell's Plain, Khayelitsha and Bellville.

The station has four tracks accessible through two island platforms. The station building is elevated above the tracks and platforms. A parking lot is situated on the eastern side of the tracks.

Services

Railway stations in Cape Town
Metrorail Western Cape stations